Harrisburg Academy is an independent, coeducational, college preparatory day school in Wormleysburg, Pennsylvania. The school has a diverse student body in nursery through 12th grade. The school was established in 1784 by John Harris Jr., the founder of Harrisburg. 

Harrisburg Academy was originally located at the John Harris Mansion and later in the eponymous Academy Manor section of the Riverside neighborhood along North Front Street, but is now located on a 24-acre (9.6 ha) campus about one mile (1.6 km) west of the Susquehanna River in Wormleysburg, a suburb of Harrisburg, Pennsylvania. In 1992-93, the school was nationally recognized as a Blue Ribbon School by the U.S. Department of Education for its academic excellence. It is now known as an IB school  

The school has a combined enrollment of 420 students, has 53 full-time faculty, and has an annual budget (in 2005) of $6.5M.

Athletic program
Harrisburg Academy offers a variety of athletic programs.  Athletic teams compete actively against other independent, parochial and smaller public schools.

In 2008, a two-year commitment between the academy and Trinity High School allows students to play for each other's designated athletic teams.

The Academy offers athletic programs for cross-country, soccer, tennis, basketball, and swimming.

Notable alumni
George Kunkel – Pennsylvania State Senator
 John C. Kunkel – a prominent American politician and Republican member of the U.S. House of Representatives from Pennsylvania.
 Vance C. McCormick – an American politician and prominent businessman; appointed chair by President Woodrow Wilson of the American delegation at the Treaty of Versailles in 1919.
 Arthur Ringwalt Rupley – Republican member of the U.S. House of  Representatives from Pennsylvania.
 Matthias Loy - American Lutheran theologian in the Evangelical Lutheran Joint Synod of Ohio.
 David A. Randall Book dealer, librarian and Professor of Bibliography at Indiana University.
Sarah Longwell - Republican political strategist and publisher of the conservative news and opinion website The Bulwark.

References

External links
Harrisburg Academy website

High schools in Central Pennsylvania
Private high schools in Pennsylvania
Education in Harrisburg, Pennsylvania
Preparatory schools in Pennsylvania
Educational institutions established in 1784
1784 establishments in Pennsylvania
Schools in Cumberland County, Pennsylvania
Private middle schools in Pennsylvania
Private elementary schools in Pennsylvania